Pap is a Hungarian surname. Notable people with the surname include:

 Arthur Pap (1921-1959), Swiss philosopher
 Béla Pap (1845-1916), Hungarian lieutenant general and Minister of Defence
 Bianka Pap (born 2000), Hungarian Paralympic swimmer
 Eduard Pap (born 1994), Romanian football goalkeeper
 Endre Pap (born 1947), Hungarian mathematician
 Eszter Pap (born 1993), Hungarian triathlete
 Géza Pap (1883-1912), Hungarian painter
 Gyula Pap (1813–1870), Hungarian ethnographer and writer of Hungarian folk tales
 János Pap (1925–1994), Hungarian politician
 Jenő Pap (born 1951), Hungarian fencer, 1982 world individual épée champion
 Károly Pap (1897-1945), Jewish Hungarian writer
 Lajos Pap (1883-1941), discredited Hungarian spiritualist medium
 Norbert Pap (born 1969), Hungarian geographer–historian
 Roland Pap (born 1990), Hungarian footballer
 Vera Pap (1956-2015), Hungarian actress

See also
 Papp, a Hungarian surname

Hungarian-language surnames